= Amy Cheng Vollmer =

American Microbiologist

Amy Cheng Vollmer is an American microbiologist and biology educator. She is an Isaac H. Clothier, Jr. Professor Emerita of Biology at Swarthmore College. During her career, she was involved in teaching, microbiology research, undergraduate mentorship, publishing scientific papers, and leadership in professional societies. Previously, she served for 10 years as the president of the Waksman Foundation for Microbiology and for 2 years as the Executive Director of Experimental Science Now, a nonprofit organization supporting science education.

== Education ==
Vollmer earned her Bachelor of Arts degree in biochemistry from Rice University and a Ph.D. in biochemistry from the University of Illinois Urbana–Champaign. She completed postdoctoral training in immunology and cancer biology at Stanford University School of Medicine.

== Academic career ==
After her postdoctoral training, Vollmer served on the faculty at Mills College for four years before joining the Department of Biology at Swarthmore College in 1989, where she taught for more than three decades and served as Biology Department chair for a total of five years before retiring in 2022.

At Swarthmore, Vollmer taught courses in microbiology, biotechnology, metabolism, virology, immunology, and related topics. She contributed to the development and leadership of the Swarthmore Summer Scholars Program.

== Research ==
Vollmer's research focuses on bacterial stress response and the gut microbiome. She has mentored numerous undergraduate students in laboratory research, with many presenting findings at national scientific meetings. Her publications include peer-reviewed articles on bacterial physiology, stress responses, and applied microbiology.

== Editorial and professional service ==
From 1999 to 2003, Vollmer served as the inaugural editor-in-chief of the journal that evolved into the Journal of Microbiology & Biology Education. She has served in leadership roles within the American Society for Microbiology (ASM) including being a member of the inaugural Board of Directors, and shepherding the Board's DEI task force in 2019-2020.

== Honors and awards ==
Vollmer was elected a fellow of the American Academy of Microbiology, an honorific leadership group within ASM that recognizes scientific achievement and contributions to microbiology. She received the Carski Distinguished Undergraduate Teaching Award from ASM in 2006 for excellence in undergraduate microbiology education, she was named a Phi Beta Kappa Visiting Scholar for the 2017-2018 academic year, and in 2025 she was elected a Fellow of the American Association for the Advancement of Science.

== Outreach and advocacy ==
Beyond her academic roles, Vollmer has promoted science literacy through public lectures and lifelong-learning courses on microbiology and immunology. She has advocated for diversity, equity, and inclusion in STEM fields and supported networks for students and faculty.
